Alexander Neu (born 10 March 1969) is a German politician. Born in Eitorf, North Rhine-Westphalia, he represents The Left. Alexander Neu served as a member of the Bundestag from the state of North Rhine-Westphalia from 2013 to 2021.

Life 
Alexander Neu is a political scientist. He became a member of the Bundestag after the 2013 German federal election, contesting Rhein-Sieg-Kreis I.. He was a member of the defense committee. He was his group's representative for Eastern Europe.

He lost his seat at the 2021 German federal election.

References

External links 

  
 Bundestag biography 

1969 births
Living people
Members of the Bundestag for North Rhine-Westphalia
Members of the Bundestag 2017–2021
Members of the Bundestag 2013–2017
Members of the Bundestag for The Left
People from Rhein-Sieg-Kreis